Eugonosia is a monotypic moth genus in the subfamily Arctiinae. Its single species, Eugonosia angulifer, is found in the Brazilian state of Paraná. Both the genus and species were first described by Schaus in 1899.

References

Lithosiini
Monotypic moth genera
Moths of South America